Tomasz Bednarek and Olivier Charroin were the defending champions but decided not to participate.
Sam Groth and John-Patrick Smith defeated Philipp Marx and Florin Mergea 7–6(7–5), 7–6(9–7) in the final to win the title.

Seeds

Draw

Draw

References
 Main Draw

Challenger Banque Nationale de Rimouski
Challenger de Drummondville